Folketing elections were held in Denmark on 6 May 1915. In order to make amendments to the constitution, the government called for the dissolution of both the Folketing and the Landsting to allow a new Rigsdag to make the revisions. However, as this was during World War I, no campaigning took place, and 105 of the 115 were uncontested.

The corresponding Landsting election was held on 22 May.

Results

References

Elections in Denmark
Denmark
Folketing election
Denmark